Seyedal (also Romanized as Seyedāl, Saidal, Seydāl, and Seyyedal; also known as Sadan) is a village in Meyghan Rural District, in the Central District of Nehbandan County, South Khorasan Province, Iran. At the 2006 census, its population was 602, in 158 families.

References 

Populated places in Nehbandan County